Jesús Pérez (born September 11, 1995) is a Trinidadian footballer who plays for Istiqlol.

International career
Pérez made his international debut in a 2–0 win over Barbados in March 2017, coming on as a substitute for Daneil Cyrus.

Career statistics

International

References

External links
 

1995 births
Living people
Trinidad and Tobago footballers
Trinidad and Tobago under-20 international footballers
Trinidad and Tobago expatriate footballers
2015 CONCACAF U-20 Championship players
Association football defenders
TT Pro League players
North East Stars F.C. players
San Juan Jabloteh F.C. players
W Connection F.C. players
Morvant Caledonia United players
Expatriate footballers in Uzbekistan
Trinidad and Tobago international footballers